William Horace Pearce (2 July 1886 – 30 July 1936) was a former Australian rules footballer who played with Carlton and St Kilda in the Victorian Football League (VFL).

Notes

External links 
		
Horrie Pearce's profile at Blueseum

1886 births
Australian rules footballers from Victoria (Australia)
Carlton Football Club players
St Kilda Football Club players
1936 deaths